Aglaophotis is a herb mentioned occasionally in works on occultism.  References to aglaophotis and to olieribos (both of which are said to be magical herbs) are made in the Simon Necronomicon.

Historic uses
The Greek doctor Dioscorides named aglaophotis as a member of the peony family, Paeoniaceae. It has been speculated that the species Paeonia officinalis, or the European peony, is the source of aglaophotis, but there is little evidence for this theory to be proved.

According to Dioscorides, peony is used for warding off demons, witchcraft, and fever. This is at odds with the presentation in the Simon Necronomicon released twenty centuries later, in which it is used to call upon dark forces.

In popular culture
Aglaophotis is portrayed throughout the Silent Hill video game series as a fluid or tablet which can expel monstrous parasites from characters' bodies.

The herb appears as a species of sentient, hostile plant monsters in Final Fantasy XI.

References

Mythological plants